Saint-Félix-de-Kingsey is a Quebec municipality located in the Drummond Regional County Municipality in the Centre-du-Quebec region. The population as of the Canada 2011 Census was 1,563. The municipality was known as the Township of Kingsey until 1999.

Demographics

Population
Population trend:

Language
Mother tongue language (2006)

See also
 List of municipalities in Quebec
 Municipal history of Quebec

References

Municipalities in Quebec
Incorporated places in Centre-du-Québec